Stephen Ademolu (born November 20, 1982) is a former Canadian soccer player and current coach/trainer.

Club career

Early career 
Ademolu played college soccer at the University of North Carolina at Pembroke during his first year and at Cleveland State University during his second and third.

At The University of North Carolina at Pembroke, he became the school's top scorer with 12 goals and six assists. Ademolu was also named 2001 Schools Top Male Athlete and Peachbelt Conference Player of the Year for the first time in the school's history.

At Cleveland State University, during his sophomore year, Ademolu was named Newcomer of the Year, first team All-Horizon League, first team NSCAA All-Ohio and third team All-Great Lakes Region. He was also top scorer with 11 goals and six assists. In his Junior year, he was named Horizon League Player of the Year, third-team All-Ohio, 16th in the nation in goals per game, 28th in the country in points per game, he led his CSU Team and the Horizon League with 12 goals and six assists and tied a school record with eight points on three goals and two assists against UIC in one game.

During his youth ages, Ademolu played for the Windsor FC Nationals scoring a total of 120 goals in the Ontario Youth Soccer League, also winning Top Goal Scorer of the Year and MVP in 1996–97. Ademolu led the Windsor FC Nationals to back to back Ontario Cups.

Trellborg
In 2005 Ademolu, signed for Trelleborgs FF in Sweden, he came in halfway through the season before getting relegated but the highlight for Ademolu was scoring his first goal in a derby game against Malmö FF. He was named team MVP for the 2005 season. In 2006, he played in the Swedish 2nd Division and scored seven goals before being sold to Tromsø IL.

Tromsø
Ademolu spent two-and-a-half seasons in at Tromsø playing in UEFA Cup games against, A.S. Roma, Strasbourg, Elsborg, FC Basel and Galatasaray. He made history when he scored a crucial goal against Galatasaray sending Tromsø into the group stages of the UEFA Cup.

Løv-Ham
After two-and-a-half seasons at Tromsø, Ademolu left to get more playing time in 2008 with Løv-Ham in the 1. divisjon. Ademolu scored 12 goals and had seven assists in 23 games, before moving on to Lithuania where he signed for FK Ekranas for two years in 2009.

Ekranas
With Ekranas, Ademolu was named in his first year playing as one of the top five players in the country. Ekranas went on to win the 2009 A Lyga Championship. He then went on to help his team win 2010 A Lyga Championship, League Cup and SuperCup. During his time at Ekranas, Ademolu played in the Champions League in 2009 where they lost in the Qualifying rounds against FK Baku and the following year lost to Finnish side Helsinki.

Windsor Stars
Ademolu returned to Canada in 2011 during a brief stint with Windsor Stars before signing in January 2012 with the Atlanta Silverbacks of the North American Soccer League.

International career
During his junior years, he was called up to the Canadian Olympic team for qualifiers.

He made his senior debut for Canada in November 2005 against Luxembourg. In January 2010, he was called for a friendly match against Jamaica in which he started. Ademolu was called up to play against Argentina on May 24, 2010 before playing Venezuela a few days later.

Coaching career
In addition to running the Ademolu Soccer Academy, Ademolu has also worked as the University of Windsor men's and women's assistant coach along with local Windsor clubs.

Personal life
Ademolu is of Jamaican and Nigerian descent. Ademolu has six brothers and one sister. His twin brother O'Nicholas also played for the Cleveland State Vikings. His cousin Michael Carter plays football for the Montreal Alouettes.

In recent years, Ademolu has featured as a sports columnist for the Urban Book Circle and for RedNation Online.

Honours
Ekranas
 A Lyga: 2009, 2010
 Lithuanian Football Cup: 2010
 Lithuanian Supercup: 2010

Individual
League1 Ontario Second Team All Star: 2017

References

External links 
 
 
  
 
 

1982 births
Living people
Association football forwards
Canadian soccer players
Soccer people from Ontario
Sportspeople from Windsor, Ontario
Black Canadian soccer players
Canadian sportspeople of Jamaican descent
Canadian sportspeople of Nigerian descent
Canadian twins
Twin sportspeople
Canadian expatriate soccer players
Expatriate footballers in Sweden
Canadian expatriate sportspeople in Sweden
Expatriate footballers in Norway
Canadian expatriate sportspeople in Norway
Expatriate footballers in Lithuania
Canadian expatriate sportspeople in Lithuania
Expatriate soccer players in the United States
Canadian expatriate sportspeople in the United States
University of North Carolina at Pembroke alumni
Cleveland State Vikings men's soccer players
Trelleborgs FF players
Tromsø IL players
Løv-Ham Fotball players
FK Ekranas players
Windsor City FC players
Atlanta Silverbacks players
Detroit City FC players
Blue Devils FC players
Allsvenskan players
Superettan players
Eliteserien players
A Lyga players
Canadian Soccer League (1998–present) players
League1 Ontario players
National Premier Soccer League players
Canada men's under-23 international soccer players
Canada men's international soccer players